Public prosecutor's offices are criminal justice bodies attached to the judiciary.

They are separate from the courts in Germany, Austria and the German-speaking parts of Switzerland, and are called the Staatsanwaltschaft.

This kind of office also exists in Mainland China, Taiwan and Macau (which continues to follow the Portuguese legal system), and in some countries in Central Europe including Slovakia, Slovenia, Poland and the Czech Republic.

See also
 Prosecution
 Parquet (legal)
 Public prosecutor's office (France)
 Public prosecutor's office (Germany)
 Public Prosecutors Office (Japan)
 Public Prosecutors Office (Brazil)
 Public Prosecutors Office (Honduras)
 Crown Prosecution Service

External links
 Eurojustice Report on Germany
 Eurojustice Report on Austria

Law enforcement
Prosecution